St. Mary's School, Mumbai or St. Mary's School I.C.S.E, is a private Catholic secondary school for boys located in Mazagaon, Mumbai, in the state of Maharashtra, India. Founded by the Jesuits in 1864, the school is affiliated with the Indian Certificate of Secondary Education (ICSE). The school is amongst the oldest, continually running, private schools in India. It is also ranked amongst the top day schools in the country.

History 
St. Mary's School was founded in 1864 by members of the Society of Jesus (Jesuits), a Roman Catholic religious order founded by St. Ignatius of Loyola in 1540. The school is located adjacent to St. Anne's Church which was established in 1860. The school began as a Catholic school of education and a military orphanage. Later it opened to the Catholic populace in general, which led to expansion and to the construction of the building that now houses the senior school, whose foundation stone was laid by Lord Linlithgow, the Viceroy of India from 1936 to 1943. At present, the school has four Gothic-style buildings and is divided into Senior School (grades 5 and above) and Junior School (grades 4 and below). The school offers various sports facilities to the students, which include a gymnasium, basketball arena, and two grass turfed football grounds.

In 1933, St. Mary's High School SSC was carved out of the main St. Mary's School – which at the tie offered the British General Certicate of Education to offer students the opportunity to focus on completion of the Secondary School Certificate. St. Mary's switched to the ICSE Indian Certificate of Secondary Education curriculum in the year 1958 – thereby, becoming one of the early adopters of the system. The school re-commenced offering the Indian School Certificate diploma (equivalent to the Cambridge A-Level) in 2021.

In recognition of its contribution in the field of education the Chief Postmaster General for Maharashtra released a special postal cover commemorating the school's 150th anniversary on 7 December 2013.

St. Mary's has continually been ranked amongst the top schools of the country. As per Education World's 2021–2022 survey, the school is ranked 2nd nationwide in the category of 'Day School for Boys'.

Students are encouraged in the arts and sports. Many amongst the school's alumni have flourished in theatre, music, and Bollywood.

Principals 
The following individuals have served as principal of the school:
 Fr. Pereira, S.J, ??-1982
 Fr. Casale, S.J., 1982-1991
 Fr. Joe Saldanha, S.J., 1991–1995
 Fr. Joe Diabrio, 1995
 Fr. Evarist Newnes, S.J., 1997–2009
 Alice Carvalho, 2009–2011
 Fr. Dr. Kenneth Misquitta, S.J., 2011–2015
 Fr. Dr. Francis Swamy, S.J., 2015–2021
 Clementine Monteiro, 2021–present

Notable alumni 

Business and economics
 Dilip Abreu – Princeton economist
 Azim Premji – Chairman of Wipro Limited
 Gautam Singhania – Chairman & MD of the Raymond Group
 Shailesh Haribhakti – Chairman of Blue Star Limited 

Law
 Joseph 'Kaka' Baptista – barrister, unionist, political activist, founder of the Indian Home Rule movement, and Mayor of Bombay
 A. G. Noorani – lawyer, constitutional expert and political commentator
 Homer Pithawalla – leading expert in corporate law and competition law; Professor of Law at Government Law College, Mumbai
 Goolam Essaji Vahanvati – Attorney General of India
 Iqbal Chagla – Senior Advocate 

Literature
 Homi K. Bhabha – professor at Harvard University
 Dom Moraes – writer and poet

Performing arts
 Sooraj Barjatya – Hindi film director
 Tushar Hiranandani – Hindi film director
 Boman Irani – theatre and Bollywood actor
 Arjun Mathur – Bollywood actor
 Zubin Mehta – orchestral conductor
 Freddie Mercury – singer, songwriter and lead vocalist of the band Queen
 Sorabh Pant – stand-up comedian
 Farukh Sheikh – Bollywood actor
 Kunal Vijaykar – actor and director
 Darrace Giant DG Cabral – Famous Bboy

Medicine
 Ritam Chowdhury – physician, epidemiologist, biostatistician, writer, poet, Harvard faculty member
 Tehemton Erach Udwadia – gastroenterologist

Sports
 Shishir Hattangadi – Bombay cricket captain
 Vijay Mohanraj – Ranji Trophy cricketer for Mumbai
 Rehan Poncha – Olympic swimmer (2008 Beijing Summer Olympics), Arjuna Awardee 
 Adille Sumariwalla – Olympic sprinter (1980 Moscow Summer Olympics), Arjuna Awardee

Science
 Vijay Balasubramanian – theoretical physicist and professor at the University of Pennsylvania

See also 

 List of Jesuit schools
 List of schools in Mumbai
 Violence against Christians in India

References

External links 
 
 

Jesuit secondary schools in India
Boys' schools in India
Schools in Colonial India
Christian schools in Maharashtra
High schools and secondary schools in Mumbai
Educational institutions established in 1864
1864 establishments in India